This is a list of film remakes. Due to the size of this page, the main listing has been split into two sections:

 List of film remakes (A–M)
 List of film remakes (N–Z)

See also
 Remake
 List of American television series based on British television series
 List of English-language films with previous foreign-language film versions
 List of Disney live-action remakes of animated films